Badge Menzies (1901 – December 1965) was a West Indian cricket umpire. He stood in one Test match, West Indies vs. England, in 1954.

Of Indian heritage, Menzies was for many years the groundsman at the Bourda cricket ground in Georgetown, British Guiana, where he lived in a shed under the pavilion. At the time the Bourda pitch had the reputation of being the best turf pitch in the Caribbean. He umpired two first-class matches at Bourda in 1944, but thereafter restricted himself to his work on the ground. 

After disputes over the standard of the umpiring during the early matches of the English tour of 1953–54, Menzies was asked to umpire the Third Test at Bourda, replacing one of the originally appointed umpires. The Test was played amid general unrest in British Guiana, and on the fourth day, when Menzies gave the West Indian player Clifford McWatt run out, there was a minor riot in which members of the crowd threw bottles and wooded crates onto the field. Menzies' decision was correct, but such was the mood of the crowds that he needed police protection for the rest of the match.

Menzies did not umpire another first-class match, but he resumed his grounds-keeping work. He was also called in after the English tour to supervise the laying of a new turf pitch to replace the matting pitch at Queen's Park Oval in Port of Spain.

See also
 List of Test cricket umpires

References

1901 births
1965 deaths
West Indian Test cricket umpires
Groundskeepers
Sportspeople from Georgetown, Guyana